Robles is a Spanish surname meaning "oaks".  Notable people with the name include:

Alejandra Robles Gil (born 1989), Mexican actress
Alfonso García Robles (1911–1991), Mexican diplomat and politician
Amelio Robles Ávila (1889–1984), Mexican revolutionary
Anthony Robles (born 1988), American sport wrestler
Aurora Robles (born 1980), Mexican fashion model
Belen Robles (born 1936), American community organizer
Caspar de Robles, 16th-century Spanish stadtholder of Groningen and Friesland
Daniel Robles, Peruvian politician
Emmanuel Roblès (1914–1995), Algerian-French author
Enrique Robles, Spanish bullfighter
Eric Robles, American animator, creator of the Nickelodeon series Fanboy & Chum Chum
Francisco Robles (1811–1893), President of Ecuador
Gil-Robles, surname of a number of Spanish politicians:
Enrique Gil Robles (1849-1908), Spanish law scholar
José María Gil-Robles y Quiñones (1898-1980), son of Enrique Gil Robles, Spanish politician,  prominent in the leadup to the Spanish Civil War
José María Gil-Robles (born 1935), son of José María Gil-Robles, Spanish politician, and president of the European Parliament (1997-1999)
Álvaro Gil-Robles (born 1944), second son of José María Gil-Robles, Spanish jurist and human rights activist
Hansel Robles (born 1990), Dominican baseball player
Jaime Robles Céspedes (born 1978), Bolivian footballer 
Joel Robles (born 1990), Spanish football player
José Robles (1897–1937), Spanish academic and left-wing activist
José Robles (cyclist) (born 1964), Colombian cyclist
José Lázaro Robles (1924–1996), Brazilian footballer
Juan Jesús Gutierrez Robles (born 1980), Spanish football player
Julián Robles (actor)
Louis Robles (born 1996), English footballer
Luis Robles (born 1984), American soccer player
Marco Aurelio Robles (1905–1990) President of Panama
Marisa Robles (born 1937), Spanish harpist
Marta Robles (born 1963), Spanish journalist and writer
Oscar Robles (born 1976), Mexican baseball player
Rafael Robles (1947–1998), Dominican Republic baseball player
Rico Robles, Filipino entertainer
Rosario Robles, Mexican politician
Sarah Robles (born 1988), American weightlifter
Víctor Robles (born 1997), Dominican baseball player
Victor L. Robles (born 1945), New York politician

Spanish-language surnames